After the General Elections held on 10 May 2001 the Governor appointed J. Jayalalithaa as the Chief Minister of Tamil Nadu. The Governor on the advice of the Chief Minister appointed five more Members C. Ponnaiyan, Dr. M. Thambi Durai, D. Jayakumar, Ayyaru Vandayar and R. Sarojaa as ministers in the Council of Ministers on the same day. On 19 May 2001 the Governor appointed nineteen more members in the council. However, Jayalalithaa couldn't last long in office and resigned to pave way for First Panneerselvam ministry.

Cabinet ministers

References

Further reading 

 

All India Anna Dravida Munnetra Kazhagam
2001 in Indian politics
J
2000s in Tamil Nadu
2001 establishments in Tamil Nadu
2001 disestablishments in India
Cabinets established in 2001
Cabinets disestablished in 2001